Common bladderwort is a common name for several plants and may refer to:

Utricularia macrorhiza, in North America and eastern temperate Asia
Utricularia vulgaris, in Asia and Europe

Utricularia species by common name